Solimana is a volcanic massif in the Andes of Peru, South America, that is approximately  high.
 It is considered an extinct stratovolcano that is part of the Central Volcanic Zone, one of the volcanic belts of the Andes. It features a caldera as well as traces of a sector collapse and subsequent erosion. The volcano is glaciated.

Geomorphology and geography

Regional
It is situated in the Arequipa Region, Condesuyos Province, in the districts of Chichas and Salamanca, and in the La Unión Province, in the districts of Cotahuasi and Toro. Several towns lie around the volcano.

Solimana is part of the Peruvian segment of the Central Volcanic Zone of the Andes. This zone of volcanoes includes, from northwest to southeast, Sara Sara, Solimana, Coropuna, Andagua volcanic field, Huambo volcanic field, Ampato, Sabancaya, Cerro Nicholson, Chachani, Misti, Ubinas, Huaynaputina, Ticsani, and Tutupaca, some of which have been active during historical time.

Local
It has a caldera, which gives it an asymmetric appearance; further on the south flank both the basement and inner parts of the edifice crop out. This asymmetry was caused by large sector collapses and subsequent erosion of the southern flank. The main edifice is formed by a compound volcano accompanied by  lava domes and lava flows as well as pyroclastic flows and lahars, the latter relating to the formation of the collapse structure.

Neighbouring canyons have begun to incise the edifice. The Cotahuasi Canyon runs north of Solimana, and the southern flank is drained by numerous quebradas.

During the last glacial maximum a number of glaciers developed on Solimana, the longest of which occupied the Quebrada Caño on the northern flank and reached  length. There have been approximately five episodes of glaciation on Solimana in total. Later glaciations after the Last Glacial maximum emplaced conspicuous moraines, which are well preserved by the arid climate. In addition, rock glaciers are present on Solimana.

Geology

This subduction process is responsible for the formation of the Andes mountains in the region.

Together with Sara Sara and Coropuna, Solimana is located on the northwestern end of the Central Volcanic Zone; no volcanism occurs farther north where the Nazca Plate subducts at a shallower angle than beneath the Central Volcanic Zone. Of these volcanoes, Solimana is considered to be the oldest and Coropuna the youngest. Solimana together with Ampato and Coropuna form the Cordillera Ampato.

The basement dates back to the Precambrian-Paleozoic and is buried beneath several pre-Oligocene formations. The Tacaza formation forms a Miocene-Oligocene layer of volcanic and sedimentary rocks that are overlain by Quaternary volcanoes, which include the Barroso Group formation and the Pliocene Sencca formation.

Composition
Samples taken from Solimana are andesite and dacite, but more recently basaltic andesite was erupted as well. The rocks contain hornblende, hypersthene, and plagioclase, with additional olivine in the phreatomagmatic deposits.

The geochemistry of volcanoes of the Central Volcanic Zone typically displays strong evidence of crustal contamination, which is attributed to the thick crust that has developed in this region. A granulitic basement may be a plausible origin of this contamination, with additional contribution of subducted sediments.

Vegetation
Llareta and ichu grass form the thin vegetation up to about  altitude.

Archeology
The Inca considered Solimana and Coropuna to be sacred mountains.

In 2008, an Inca archeological site was discovered on Solimana's eastern flank, in the locality of Minticocha. The site most likely served religious and ceremonial purposes. According to colonial period sources, Solimana is the site of a major oracle, but this oracle is more likely to be located at Muyu Muyu close to the town of Yanque than at Minticocha.

Eruption history
Solimana is an extinct volcano. It was active during the Miocene and Pliocene between 4 and 1.5 million years ago, with the last eruption occurring between 500,000 and 300,000 years ago. The collapses occurred at some time between 3.05 and 1.5 million years ago and after the collapse volcanism became centered inside the collapse scar and its margins, with the youngest activity forming phreatomagmatic deposits within the caldera and a scoria cone on its south.

Solimana may be the source of the Lomas pyroclastic flow deposit and the Upper Sencca ignimbrite. Solimana still features fumarolic activity within the caldera and the Peruvian geophysical institute has installed a geodesic control point on the volcano. It is considered a moderately dangerous volcano.

Notes

References

Stratovolcanoes of Peru
Mountains of Arequipa Region
Andean Volcanic Belt
Pleistocene stratovolcanoes
Six-thousanders of the Andes
Mountains of Peru